The 2001 X-Factor Grand Prix of Sonoma was the fifth round of the 2001 American Le Mans Series season.  It took place at Infineon Raceway, California, on July 22, 2001.

Official results
Class winners in bold.

Statistics
 Pole Position - #1 Audi Sport North America - 1:21.745
 Fastest Lap - #2 Audi Sport North America - 1:23.000
 Distance - 433.944 km
 Average Speed - 157.465 km/h

External links
 Official Results
 World Sports Racing Prototypes - Race Results

S
Grand Prix of Sonoma